{{DISPLAYTITLE:E∞-operad}}
In the theory of operads in algebra and algebraic topology, an E∞-operad is a parameter space for a multiplication map that is associative and commutative "up to all higher homotopies". (An operad that describes a multiplication that is  associative but not necessarily commutative "up to homotopy" is called an A∞-operad.)

Definition 
For the definition, it is necessary to work in the category of operads with an action of the symmetric group. An operad A is said to be an E∞-operad if all of its spaces E(n) are contractible; some authors also require the action of the symmetric group Sn on E(n) to be free. In other categories than topological spaces, the notion of contractibility has to be replaced by suitable analogs, such as acyclicity in the category of chain complexes.

En-operads and n-fold loop spaces
The letter E in the terminology stands for "everything" (meaning associative and commutative), and the infinity symbols says that commutativity is required up to "all" higher homotopies. More generally, there is a weaker notion of En-operad (n ∈ N), parametrizing multiplications that are commutative only up to a certain level of homotopies. In particular,

 E1-spaces are A∞-spaces;
 E2-spaces are homotopy commutative A∞-spaces.

The importance of En- and E∞-operads in topology stems from the fact that iterated loop spaces, that is, spaces of continuous maps from an n-dimensional sphere to another space X starting and ending at a fixed base point, constitute algebras over an En-operad. (One says they are En-spaces.)  Conversely, any connected En-space X is an n-fold loop space on some other space (called BnX, the n-fold classifying space of X).

Examples 
The most obvious, if not particularly useful, example of an E∞-operad is the commutative operad c given by c(n) = *, a point, for all n. Note that according to some authors, this is not really an E∞-operad because the Sn-action is not free. This operad describes strictly associative and commutative multiplications. By definition, any other E∞-operad has a map to c which is a homotopy equivalence.

The operad of little n-cubes or little n-disks is an example of an En-operad that acts naturally on n-fold loop spaces.

See also 
 operad
 A-infinity operad
 loop space

References 
 

Abstract algebra
Algebraic topology